Manafon is a 2009 album by David Sylvian. It is an avant-garde work combining elements of free improvisation, experimental rock and chamber music. It reached rank No. 6 in The Wire'''s list of best 2009 albums.

ProductionManafon was recorded over a three-year period in Vienna, Tokyo and London. Of the recording process, Sylvian said:

"There was nothing written when we went into the studio – this was very much free improvisation. So, the selection of the group of musicians for each improvisation was paramount. I recognized on the day which pieces could work for me. The process was that I took the material away and then wrote and recorded the vocal line over in a couple of hours. So I couldn't analyze my contribution and that in a way was my form of improvisation – and I enjoyed the rapidity of response."

"I take the sessions and work on them at a later time. I attempt to 'improvise' lyrics and melodies as I go, writing and recording all in a matter of hours. The basic tracks themselves undergo little or no editing as such. The structure pretty much remains as given from the original sessions. I might add an introduction or overdub other elements onto the original take. Here's a couple of examples: "Senseless Violence": Recorded in Vienna with Rowe/Polwechsel/Fennesz. I added guitar parts then layered Tilbury's piano into the track then added the vocal and an introduction. "Greatest Living Englishman: Initial take" suggested acoustic guitar overdubs which I requested of Otomo and Tetuzi on the spot. I later cut and pasted some interesting turntable activity from an alternate take onto this track. I also added an introduction by cutting and pasting elements from an earlier take. Tilbury was added to the coda. Melody and vocal added. "Rabbit Skinner": no editing. added acoustic guitar myself then vocals."

Lyrical inspiration
For the recording of Manafon, Sylvian was also inspired by the Welsh poet R. S. Thomas: lyrics often reflect the main themes written by the poet and the title of the album refers indeed to a Welsh namesake village (in north Powys) in which Thomas lived for a while.

"Manafon is indeed a village in Wales, a village in which Thomas lived for sometime and served as rector to the parish. In this small village, Thomas had trouble filling the pews of a Sunday but in a sense it was something of an idyllic spot in which to raise a child (a strict, taciturn and somewhat indifferent parent), master his profession and write his poetry. So, the physically real village became for me a metaphor for the poetic imagination."

Track listing

A limited edition boxed set came with a DVD of the album in 5.1 Surround Sound, and a feature-length making-of documentary, Amplified Gesture.

Personnel

Musicians
 David Sylvian – vocals (all tracks except 8), acoustic guitar (2), keyboards (3, 6), electronics (5, 7, 8)
 Christian Fennesz – laptop, guitar (exc. 4)
 Werner Dafeldecker – acoustic bass (1, 3, 5, 6, 9)
 Michael Moser – cello (1, 3, 6, 9)
 Toshimaru Nakamura – no input mixer (1, 4)
 Otomo Yoshihide – turntables (1, 3, 4), acoustic guitar (right channel) (4)
 Burkhard Stangl – guitar (1, 5)
 John Tilbury – piano (2–4, 6–8)
 Evan Parker – saxophone (2, 7, 8)
 Joel Ryan – tape signal processing (2, 7, 8)
 Marcio Mattos – cello (2, 8)
 Keith Rowe – guitar (3, 6, 9)
 Franz Hautzinger – trumpet (3, 9)
 Tetuzi Akiyama – electric and acoustic guitar (left channel) (4)
 Sachiko M. – sine waves (4)

Production
 David Sylvian – production, engineering, mixing, art direction
 Additional engineers: Christoph Amann (Vienna), Toshihiko Kasai (Tokyo), Sebastian Lexer, Neil Tucker (London)
 Yuka Fujii – art direction
 Chris Bigg – design
 Atsushi Fukui – David Sylvian portrait and related drawings
 Ruud van Empel – cover artworks (Study in Green N° 1, 5, 8 (2003), Study in Green N° 16'' (2004) courtesy Flatland Gallery, Utrecht)

Special thanks to:
Richard Chadwick, Yuka Fujii, Adrian Molloy, Chris Bigg, Sarah Humphries, Steve Jansen, Noël Akchoté, Philipp Wachsmann and all the musicians who generously participated in this recording.

References

External links
 Official site

2009 albums
David Sylvian albums
Samadhi Sound albums